Luzsky District is an administrative and municipal district (raion), one of the thirty-nine in Kirov Oblast, Russia. It is located in the northwest of the oblast. Its administrative center is the town of Luza. As of the 2010 Census, the total population of the district was 18,688, with the population of Luza accounting for 60.3% of that number.

History
The district was established in 1963 by merging of Lalsky and Podosinovsky Districts, although Podosinovsky District was split back at a later date.

References

Notes

Sources

Districts of Kirov Oblast
States and territories established in 1963
